The , referred to in North American and Australian markets as the Yaris and in Asian markets as the Vios, is a subcompact sedan manufactured by Toyota. 

The successor to the Platz sedan, the Belta has increased in size over the previous generation such that its interior volume is comparable to the E120 series Corolla. The Belta went on sale in Japan on 28 November 2005 equipped with 1.0 to 1.3 L engines and was available at Toyopet Store dealerships. Export sales began in 2006, with most markets receiving a 1.5 L 1NZ-FE engine as standard fitment. The smaller 1.3 L 2NZ-FE engine was also offered in selected markets.

The Belta was sold as the second generation Vios in China, Taiwan and selected Southeast Asian countries. In the Americas, Middle East, South Africa and Australia, it was marketed as the Yaris sedan, replacing the Echo sedan.

In June 2012, the Japanese-market Belta was discontinued and replaced by the E160 series Corolla, and it was dropped in the US and Canada to be replaced by the Mazda2 sedan-based Yaris sedan/Scion iA in 2016. However, the Belta was still produced in Japan for export to Mexico and Australia until it was discontinued in both countries in 2016. For the Asian market, the XP150 series Vios replaced the XP90 model in 2013 as the sedan counterpart to the XP150 Yaris hatchback.

The "Belta" nameplate was revived in November 2021 for the rebadged Suzuki Ciaz sold in South Africa.

The name "Belta" is a contraction of the Italian words "bella gente", or "beautiful people".



Development 
The XP90 Vitz and Belta share underpinnings with each other including the drivetrain and platform. However, while the Vitz was designed at Toyota's French design studios, the Belta was designed at Toyota's Japanese design studios—design projects for similar cars marketed toward different demographics. While the outgoing Vitz and Platz models look and feel very much alike, the newer Vitz hatchback and Belta sedans are more subtly related. No sheetmetal is shared between the two, and although both have a similar centralized dashboard design (Toyota's efforts to standardize the design for all markets, left or right hand drive) there are some cosmetic differences. The Belta is the only subcompact sedan which was designed, built and sold in Japan, and has no direct competitors in the Japanese domestic market, as the Vitz's competitors did not offer sedan versions at the time.

Markets

Asia 
For most Asian markets (except Japan, Hong Kong and Macau), the Belta was sold as the second generation Vios which was built and assembled in China, Malaysia, the Philippines, Thailand and Vietnam. It was launched first in April 2007. For the Japanese and rest of the world, the Belta/Yaris sedan were manufactured in Japan.

As was the first generation Vios, the second generation Vios was continued to assembled at Thailand's Toyota Gateway Plant, the Philippines Santa Rosa, Laguna Plant and also by FAW Toyota in China.

The second generation Vios was the best-selling car in Southeast Asia in 2009.

Japan 
The "1KR-FE" and 2SZ-FE engines comes with Super CVT-i transmission (the former is also available with 5-speed manual) while the 2NZ-FE engine has a 4-speed Super ECT transmission and only available as AWD. The car was offered with two trim levels; X and G, the latter was not available with 1.0 L engine and both could be optioned with AWD option. Optional S (sporty), L (luxury) or Business (commercial/fleet) packages were also available for the cheaper X trim.

China 
The second generation Vios was introduced to China in 2008. Engine choices for Chinese variants consist of the 1.3-litre 2NZ-FE and the 1.6-litre 4ZR-FE only available in China. 5-speed manual and 4-speed automatic are available as standard. Sunroof option is also available exclusively for this market.

Mainland China Vios trim levels include:

 1.3/1.6 GL-i
 1.6 GL-S
 1.6 GLX-i

Lifan made a copy of Vios with different front and rear fascia, the car is called 530. It was also rebadged and sold in Ghana as Kantanka Amoanimaa.

Southeast Asia

Indonesia 
The second generation Vios was officially launched to the Indonesian market on 11 April 2007 and the taxi fleet exclusive Limo was launched few months later. The Indonesian Vios can be distinguished from other countries' and Limo models with its V-shaped grille ornament. Like the outgoing NCP42, the NCP93 Vios was offered in E/Limo (with manual transmission only) and G (with either manual or automatic transmission) trim levels.

All trim levels except Limo come equipped with ABS, analog instrument panel and side mirrors with electric adjuster and retract. For the interior, the Limo and E trim has full black interior color, while G has two tone black and beige colors combination and 60:40 split back seat. The Limo and E trim has rear drum brakes and the G trim comes with all discs. The higher-grade G trim has standard dual SRS airbags (single for E trim), front and rear fog lamps, audio control on the steering wheel, auto-leveling HID headlamps, multi-information display and back sonar. Start/Stop push button was only available on the G trim with automatic transmission. For the exterior, the Limo can be distinguished by the use of steel rims, without side moldings and chrome garnish on the trunk (same as E trim) and blinkers on the front fender, while E and G trims are equipped with alloy wheels (14 inch for E trim and 15 inch for G trim), blinkers on side mirrors and chrome garnish on the trunk for G trim.

For the facelifted model, the Indonesian Vios following the same appearance as other countries' models. The interior is also slightly changed with new flat-bottom style steering wheel and back seat with armrest. In addition to the regular trim levels, there was also a TRD Sportivo model based on the G trim which adds an all-round body kit to the exterior and comes fitted with an AV DVD player and navigational capabilities. The Limo did not received any improvement.

Malaysia 
The second generation Vios was unveiled in Kuala Lumpur, Malaysia on 5 October 2007, two weeks ahead of its official launch on 19 October 2007. The Vios is powered exclusively by the 1NZ-FE 1.5 L four-cylinder engine with VVT-i, which included a redesigned air intake and exhaust system to improve low to mid-range torque. It was also fitted with the Super ECT four-speed automatic with the same gear ratios as its predecessor, but with improved programming for the transmission control unit. Electric power steering was offered in place of the hydraulic system in its predecessor.
The second generation Vios was made available in four trim levels for the Malaysian market: J, E, G and S.

The J is the base version. It was initially unavailable at the Malaysian Vios launch in October 2007, but was introduced on 1 July 2008, offering a choice of either 5-speed manual or 4-speed automatic transmissions.

The E and G differ mostly in terms of equipment levels and are mechanically identical, both sharing the 4-speed Super ECT transmission.

The S is an addition featuring cosmetic enhancements, including a front bumper spoiler, side skirts, rear skirt and a bootlid spoiler. The interior received a dark grey/black trim treatment and an Optitron meter with a multi-information display, as opposed to the E and G trims' conventional backlit display. The S trim was the most expensive Vios variant. On 17 June 2009, UMW Toyota launched the Vios 1.5 TRD Sportivo which effectively replaced the S trim. It featured a body kit, Enkei wheels, various interior trim improvements and an optional sports suspension kit.

On 15 April 2010, the Vios received a facelift in Malaysia, offering mostly cosmetic improvements. The Vios TRD Sportivo was updated on 29 June 2011, featuring a redesigned grille, unique alloy wheels and leather seats. Another new grade positioned between G and TRD Sportivo called the G Limited was also introduced offering a body kit, 15-inch alloy wheels and leather seats. The Vios was updated on 21 June 2012 in response to Honda Malaysia's facelift of the fifth generation City, with appearance changes without significant mechanical improvements.

All model grades included ABS with EBD and BA at the October 2007 launch, but the E trim was only offered with a single driver's airbag, whereas the G and S trims had an additional passenger airbag. The J trim had no airbags at all upon its July 2008 launch, but was nonetheless offered with ABS + EBD and BA. The J trim later received a driver's airbag in its 2010 facelift and a front passenger airbag in its 2012 update.

The Malaysian Vios was assembled locally by ASSB, a subsidiary of UMW Toyota, in Shah Alam, Selangor. The Vios has since become the best selling non-national badged vehicle in Malaysia, achieving record sales in 2012.

Philippines 

In the Philippines, the second generation Vios was launched in August 2007 in 3 trim levels: 1.3 J, 1.3 E and 1.5 G. All trim levels were available with a 5-speed manual transmission, the G trim also with a 4-speed automatic transmission.

The 1.5 G Limited XX Edition was released in July 2008. This is the same as the G trim, but came with HID headlights, 17-inch 10-spoke alloy wheels and a small rubber spoiler. The 1.5 S also got this spoiler and different 17-inch Rota Bolognia Mags with 205/45 tires. The G XX Limited and S trims were released in different colour schemes.

A facelifted model was launched on April 6, 2010, with a redesigned front grille, redesigned headlamp and tail lamp assemblies, and redesigned 15-inch alloy wheels (for the G trim). It was available in three trim levels: the base 1.3 J mated to a 5-speed manual transmission, the 1.3 E, with the choice of a 5-speed manual or the now available 4-speed automatic transmission, and the 1.5 G, with the choice of a 5-speed manual or 4-speed automatic transmission.

For 2012, a 1.3-liter engine for the G trim was released, and it was mated to a 4-speed automatic transmission, then later a 5-speed manual transmission equipped with fog lights and 15-inch alloy wheels. Two new trims were also available from 2012, a trim lower than G trim called the J Limited which added fog lights, 15-inch alloy wheels, front passenger airbag and more colors option from higher trim and a trim lower than the J trim called the 1.3 Base, which came only in a 5-speed manual transmission. In 2013, the 1.5 TRD Sportivo trim was released.

During its entire period on the market, the second generation Vios was the best selling car in the Philippines helping Toyota to maintain its status as the best selling brand in the country.

Singapore 
In Singapore, the Vios was sold in the base model J, the mid-level E and the top-of-the-line G trim levels, and later the TRD Sportivo model.

The J trim is the lowest version and comes standard with a CD/MP3/WMA player with 4 speakers, keyless entry, ABS/EBD/BA (on front disc brakes only), driver-only SRS airbag and interior fabric with dark grey colour seats.

The E trim is the only manual variant after the local dealer discontinued the manual J variant in Singapore. The E Classic includes an additional SRS airbag for the front passenger and side moulding. There is another variant of the E trim known as the Elegance that includes leather seats and fog lights.

The G trim is the top-of-the-line version available in Singapore and comes with an automatic transmission. The G trim adds optitron meters with multi-information display, four-wheel disc brakes, and 60:40 split foldable rear seats.

Optional "Sport" and “Racing” bodykit were offered in late 2008 featuring aftermarket alloy wheels, red stitching on the leather seats and floor mats, gear knob, brushed studded pedals and badging to denote these models in its special run. These were available as optional extras by the Toyota dealership in Singapore (Borneo Motors). With the facelift in 2011, three colours were added – Grey Metallic (1G3), Attitude Black Mica (211) and Blackish Red Mica (3R0) – to make 7 colours in total. In December 2012, Borneo Motors (Singapore) introduced a "Sportivo" variant based on the E grade, consisting of a TRD sports kit and 15” TRD multi-spoke alloy rims. Trims were also split into LX Classic and LX Elegance for the J and E variants. These were offered as a cost effective measure for customers who wanted the variant in base form or with extras such as leather seats, piano black interior trims and solar film. In 2013, only the E grade remained in the lineup for the Vios.

Thailand 
Thailand, which currently manufactures the Vios, was offered in three trim levels (J, E and G), as well as two limited edition trim levels (G Limited and S Limited). Thailand was currently the only country that offers all existing grades of the Vios, while export markets are only given a fraction of the Thai range in varying combinations. In addition, certainly the range of equipment in Thai Vios' differs from those in export versions.

The J is the basic trim level of the second generation Vios, offering a CD/MP3/WMA player with four speakers, an optional keyless entry with TVSS, ABS/EBD/BA, 15-inch steel wheels with hubcaps, rear fog lamps and interior fabric with dark grey colour seat.

The E is a mid-level trim featuring a keyless entry with TDS, an option between dark grey or ivory-coloured seat fabrics, optional driver and front passenger SRS airbags, front and rear fog lamps, 15-inch sports alloy wheels and side moulding.

The G trim features an unchangeable 6 speaker CD/MP3/WMA player, leather seating in either dark grey or ivory, driver and front passenger SRS airbags, a multi-functional steering wheel, 15-inch sports alloy wheels front and rear fog lamps, side moulding, a blue "Optitron" panel with a multi-information display and 60:40 fold-down rear seats.

The G Limited trim includes a keyless and smart entry with TDS, a Start/Stop push button, an immobilizer key and a body kit to the exterior.

The limited edition S Limited trim features a "Wrap-Around Aeropart" body kit, an orange "Optitron" panel with a multi-information display, high intensity discharge headlamps with automatic height adjustment and all-wheel disc brakes.

Audio systems in all second generation Vios trim levels are equipped with ASL (Auto-Speed Sound Levelizer), which detects and compensates for changes in external noise levels, adjusting volume and tone controls automatically based on the car's speed.

Toyota Thailand has also exported the Vios to the Middle East, Australia and South Africa, where it was sold as the Yaris.

The second generation Vios has been campaigned in One Make Races in Bangkok.

North America 
The Belta is sold alongside the XP90 Vitz in the United States and Canada. The Belta went on sale in April 2006 for the 2007 model year, being badged as the Yaris sedan, since these markets use the Yaris nameplate for the 3-door (last model year of availability there was 2008) and 5-door Vitz hatchbacks, also known as the Yaris 3-door and Yaris 5-door, respectively.

In the United States, the Yaris sedan is available with modular convenience, power, and all-weather guard packages, contrasting with the global Belta's conventional trim levels. However, the Yaris sedan was also available as the Yaris S, which has standard convenience and appearance packages fitted as standard. The power package on the Yaris sedan offers alloy wheels as an option. Side airbags were optional.  The Canadian version is being based on the US-market Yaris S with power and all-weather guard packages, but with standard  wheels. The regular CE, LE and RS trims used in the Canadian Yaris hatchback are replaced in the Yaris sedan by option packages of B, C, D or Aero types. The B adds  all-season tires, chrome trim on the decklid, front and rear splash guards, colour-keyed door handles, blacked-out side window frames, keyless entry and power door locks; the C adds ABS, air conditioning, power windows, colour-keyed mirrors and power mirrors; the D adds both side and side-curtain airbags; the Aero adds alloy wheels, wheel locks, a rear spoiler and a body kit. The Aero, however, has neither air conditioning nor side airbags. The Canadian model lacks the two-tone interior, pseudo-metallic trim on the door panels and the new audio system controls (instead it uses an old design) found on the Japanese and American models. 

However, because the EPA changed the way they calculate fuel economy, ratings were revised for the 2008 model year and the Yaris was rated at  city/ mpg highway for the manual transmission, and  mpg city/ mpg highway for the automatic version.

For the 2009 model year which was a facelift, all Yaris sedans received updated styling with a new grille, alloy designs, interior fabric, standard side curtain airbags and anti-lock brakes. There are also options such as a leather-wrapped steering wheel/shift knob and satellite radio.

Australia 
In Australia, it is known as the Yaris sedan and was sold alongside the Vitz-based Yaris hatchback. The Yaris sedan was available only in a 1.5 L 1NZ-FE  petrol engine. There were two variants of the model, namely the YRS and YRX, with the former being the model with the basic necessities. The YRX model features an all-round body kit and was available in an automatic transmission or 5-speed manual transmission.

The Australian version of the Yaris sedan uses orange blinker bulbs with clear lenses instead of orange blinker lenses.

At the end of 2016, the Australian version Yaris sedan was discontinued due to poor sales with over 27 percent drop. It was then phased out with no direct replacement for the Australian market.

Safety

United States 
Standard safety features include airbags, front seatbelt pretensioners, and head restraints for all seating positions. Side-impact airbags, side curtain airbags and ABS are optional on 2007–2008 models. Beginning in 2009, front and rear row side curtain airbags along with front seat-mounted torso side airbags and anti-lock brakes became standard. Stability control was unavailable on all models until the 2010 model year when it became standard.

According to the US Insurance Institute for Highway Safety (IIHS) the Yaris sedan received a "Good" overall score in the frontal crash test and a "Good" overall score in the side impact test on models equipped with side airbags but a "Poor" overall score on models without side airbags. In their roof strength evaluation the Yaris is rated "Acceptable" with a strength-to-weight ratio of 3.78.

U.S. National Highway Traffic Safety Administration (NHTSA) Yaris sedan crash test ratings:

Southeast Asia 
ASEAN NCAP test results for a RHD, 4-door sedan on a 2012 registration:

Suzuki Ciaz-based model 

The "Belta" nameplate was revived in November 2021 for the rebadged Suzuki Ciaz sold in the Middle East and Africa.

References

External links 

 Toyota's press release of the Belta

Belta
Cars introduced in 2005
2010s cars
Subcompact cars
ASEAN NCAP superminis
Sedans
Front-wheel-drive vehicles
All-wheel-drive vehicles
Vehicles with CVT transmission